Schenkl is an Austro-Bavarian surname. Notable people with the surname include:

 Maurus von Schenkl (1749–1816), German Benedictine theologian and canon law jurist
 Karl Schenkl (1827–1900), Austrian classical philologist
 Emilie Schenkl (1910–1996), Austrian-Indian leader in the Indian Independence Movement

See also
 Schenk
 Schenck